Hürriyet (Liberty) is one of the major Turkish newspapers, founded in 1948. 
, it had the highest circulation of any newspaper in Turkey at around 319,000. Hürriyet has a mainstream, liberal and conservative outlook. Hürriyet combines entertainment with news coverage.

Hürriyet has regional offices in Istanbul, Ankara, Izmir, Adana, Antalya and Trabzon, as well as a news network comprising 52 offices and 600 reporters in Turkey and abroad, all affiliated with Doğan News Agency, which primarily serves newspapers and television channels that were previously under the management of Doğan Media Group (Doğan Yayın Holding). Hürriyet is printed in six cities in Turkey and in Frankfurt, Germany. , according to Alexa, its website was the tenth most visited in Turkey, the second most visited of a newspaper and the fourth most visited news website. On 21 March 2018, Doğan Yayın Holding, the parent company of Hürriyet, was sold to Demirören Holding for approximately $1.2 billion. The Demirören Group is known for its pro-government stance.

History
Hürriyet was founded by Sedat Simavi on 1 May 1948 with a staff of 48. Selling 50,000 in its first week, Hürriyet was Simavi's 59th and last publication.

It is considered a high-circulation newspaper in Turkey.

In 2018, Hurriyet was bought by Demirören Holding, owned by the Demirören family who are considered to be close to President Erdoğan.

Tax fine controversy
In February 2009, the newspaper received an 826.2 million TL (US$523 million) fine for tax evasion by Doğan Group/Petrol Ofisi. Following this, the Istanbul Stock Exchange suspended Doğan Holding's shares, and Fitch downgraded Hürriyet to 'BB−'.

Executives at the Doğan Group expressed the opinion that the tax fine was politically motivated "intimidation", caused by Hürriyet linking of Prime Minister Recep Tayyip Erdoğan and his political party, AKP, to a charity scandal in Germany. In March 2009, Jose Manuel Barroso, president of the European Commission, expressed public concern about the fine, saying that it threatened "pluralism and freedom of the press."

In September 2009, Doğan Group was fined a record US$2.5 billion, related to alleged past tax irregularities.

The September fine caused further expressions of public concern from the European Commission, as well as the Organization for Security and Co-operation in Europe. It also caused some critics and global investors to compare the fines to then-Russian President Vladimir Putin's use of tax-evasion charges to bankrupt oil company Yukos for allegedly political reasons. In an interview, Erdoğan denied this charge, calling it "very ugly" and "disrespectful" to both himself and Putin.

Notable people

 Ahmet Altan
 Fatih Altaylı
 Feyza Algan
 Yalçın Bayer
 Burak Bekdil
 Orhan Boran
 Ege Cansen
 Bekir Coşkun
 Emin Çölaşan
 Cengiz Çandar
 Latif Demirci
 Yalçın Doğan
 Bülent Düzgit
 Oktay Ekşi
 Çetin Emeç
 Ahmet Hakan
 Doğan Hızlan
 Özdemir İnce
 Halit Kıvanç
 Emre Kızılkaya
 Şükrü Kızılot
 Ercan Kumcu
 Gary S. Lachman
 Çetin Özek
 Ertuğrul Özkök
 Güzin Sayar
 Erman Şener
 Tufan Türenç
 Doğan Uluç
 Cüneyt Ülsever
 Didem Ünsal
 Sinem Vural

Golden Butterfly Awards 

Hürriyet, along with Pantene, sponsors the annual Golden Butterfly Awards, in which its readers vote for nominees in the fields of Turkish television and music.

References

External links
 
Hürriyet USA
Hürriyet Corporate 
Hürriyet news 

1948 establishments in Turkey
Bağcılar
Doğan Media Group
Newspapers published in Istanbul
Publications established in 1948
Turkish-language newspapers
Daily newspapers published in Turkey